Daylight's End is a 2016 American action horror film directed by William Kaufman and written by Chad Law.  It stars Johnny Strong as a drifter in post-apocalyptic Texas who agrees to help survivors, played by Lance Henriksen, Louis Mandylor, and Hakeem Kae-Kazim, escape to safety.  Mixed martial arts fighter Krzysztof Soszynski plays the leader of vampire-like creatures that attempt to kill them.

Synopsis 

The movie starts with a battered 1970 Plymouth Road Runner, with the windows covered with mesh and bars, driving through a rural landscape.  It stops at a derelict gas station, and the driver gets out, wearing sunglasses and a balaclava.  Heavily armed, he searches the gas station, looking for supplies.  He stops upon seeing a icebox with a bloody handprint on it.  The driver quickly locks it, and immediately steps back as it rocks back and forth.  Growling and snarling noises can be heard inside.  The driver chains the icebox to the bumper of his car, pulls it into the sunlight, then shoots the lock off.   A humanoid figure falls out, howling and screaming as the sun hits it.  After a few moments, the creature shrivels up and dies, smoking. The driver removes his balaclava, looking at the smoking corpse with contempt.  He then kicks the chain off his car and drives away.

The opening credits roll, indicating that some kind of plague or pandemic has swept the country, reducing much of the population to violent animals that are vulnerable to sunlight, much like vampires.

The driver then has a dream where he is with a dark-haired woman who is pregnant.  After waking up, the driver then starts his car, and he drives off again.  The Road Runner then drives into a small town, where the streets are empty and the building are abandoned and derelict.  While searching one building for supplies, the driver comes across what looks like another humanoid in a doorway, visible through a bead curtain. He opens fire with his rifle, but the creature doesn't fall over.  He parts the curtain to see that the figure is a corpse that was hung up by its neck.  Realizing it is a trap, the driver flees, only to be ambushed by more creatures.  After a violent struggle, he shoots them all.

Next, the driver is on a rooftop, resting and cutting notches in the butt of his rifle to indicate how many creatures he has killed.  The rifle's butt is covered with notches.  He hears the sound of a woman talking, looks over the rooftop, and sees a cop car approaching a lone woman sitting in the middle of an intersection. He gathers up his weapons and supplies, then runs off.  Three men and a woman get out of the car, approaching the woman siting in the middle of the road, who is holding what appears to be a baby and talking to it.  As one of the men from the car approaches the sitting woman to see if she is okay, shots ring out.  Two of the men from the cop car fall dead as a gang of looters open fire.  After a short gun battle, the remaining man from the cop car is shot and the looters take the woman from the car, named Samantha, hostage.  She tells them to take whatever they want and they instead prepare to gang-rape her. 

The driver of the Road Runner, watching this, attacks the looters and quickly kills them all. Samantha says that he can't leave her and the woman sitting in the road behind, and says if the driver takes them to her home base, she promises him food, water, fuel and ammo.  The driver agrees.  Samantha says she is with a group of survivors in an abandoned police station, many of her fellow survivors are cops, and they even have running water and electricity.  The driver introduces himself as Roarke.  As they arrive at the police station as the sun sets (in Dallas, Texas), more creatures attack them as they arrive at the station.  Samantha calls for her fellow survivors on a walkie-talkie for help and several cops emerge from the station's underground parking garage, providing cover fire and killing many of the creatures.  Just as they retreat inside the underground garage, a much larger creature appears, that seems to be leading the pack.  This larger creature is wearing a cloth over his head and camouflage fatigues.  Roarke is shocked to see him - and Samantha notices this.

Roarke is questioned by the cops, and he reveals that he drove all the way from New York City, hunting and killing as many creatures as he can.   Their leader, Chief Frank Hill, is suspicious of Roarke and think he may be lying and plans to kill them all and take what he wants.  Sam protests that he saved her life and asks that Roarke be treated fairly, but he is instead stripped of his weapons.  Roarke is told by Frank Hill that his deal with Samantha will be honored for food, water and fuel - but they don't fully trust him, so he will be locked in a cell overnight.  After this, Samantha reveals that her group managed to find a flyable cargo plane about 100 miles away.  The survivors plan to use the plane to reach another, much larger survivor colony in Baja California.  One survivor, a pilot names Vince, says he can fly the plane out to safety if they can get to it.  They plan to leave for the plane first thing in the morning.    Frank's son, Ethan, tells Roarke of how they all came to be in the station and that Samantha used to date his brother Evan before he was turned into one of the creatures.  Samantha comes to Roarke's cell and they talk.  She tells him that she noticed how he seemed to recognize the large creature and he says that it took something from him - and he'll do anything he can to get it back.

That night, Roarke dreams of the dark-haired woman again, and at the end of the dream, the woman opens her eyes - which are bloodshot and she opens her mouth to emit a scream just like the creatures he has been hunting.  This startles Roarke awake.

Roarke and the survivors can hear a lot of banging and scraping sounds outside the police station.  While that is going on, several creatures manage to break in and kill some survivors before Roarke gets out of his cell and kills the creatures.  The next morning, the survivors go outside the police station to see what the noise was, and are shocked to see that a large number of abandoned cars and trucks have been dragged over and dumped right outside the entrance to the police station's underground parking garage, blocking it off.  The creatures have never done this before, and deduce that the large creature in the camouflage fatigues is teaching the other creatures how to do this.  Because of this, they quickly dub this creature "The Alpha".  The survivors realize that they lack the manpower and equipment to move so many wrecked cars in such a short amount of time, believing that whatever they can move will simply be replaced overnight by the creatures.  The survivors than plan to find as many possible running vehicles as they can to move everyone to the plane they found earlier, but Roarke has another idea - he will attack the creature's stronghold, an abandoned hotel a few blocks away, and kill The Alpha.  He says the rest of the creatures will tear each other apart to become the new Alpha and that will give the survivors enough time to evacuate to the plane.  The other survivors are highly skeptical of this, but four of them - Vlad, Drew, Chris, and Ethan - agree to join Roarke for his mission.  Hill and another cop, Bishop, stand watch from atop the police station.  Hill also sends several survivors out to look for cars they can recover and bring back to the station.

Roarke's team find the creatures all asleep in the hotel basement, and they plan to put bombs at the basement entrances to kill the creatures.  Drew volunteers to put one of the bombs on the far side of the basement to seal that way out, but the Alpha surprises and kills Drew, which awakens the rest of the creatures.  A running gun battle throughout the hotel ensues, and while many creatures are killed, Chris gets separated from the others and is attacked from behind and pulled into a room where he is killed.  Vlad decides to provide cover while Ethan and Roarke flee.  Vlad manages to kill several creatures before becoming infected.  He then detonates a grenade, killing himself and other creatures nearby.  Ethan and Roarke make it to the roof, where Ethan decides to sneak back in and get a rope from Chris's body so they can  rappel from the roof to the ground.   Ethan makes it to Chris and gets the rope, but Chris reanimates into a creature and bites him.  Ethan makes it back to the roof, and tells Roarke he's been infected.  He then sits down, takes a drink from a flask and starts to turn.  Roarke says to "Rest easy, pal" and shoots Ethan, then he rappels down from the roof.   He runs back to the police station with many creatures coming after him.

Samantha and another survivor named Dugan each recover a car and drive them back to the police station but there are close to 40 people.  Two cars simply cannot carry enough of them to the plane.  While they are arguing in front of the police station, another survivor pulls  up with a bus, and the survivors cheer.  But their relief is cut off when Roarke is seen running back, with the creatures right behind him  Bishop and Hill open fire first from the rooftops, cutting down a few creatures.  The other survivors all open fire, but there are too many creatures.  Dugan tries to flee in the car he found, but crashes in an alley.  Surrounded by creatures, he shoots himself rather than be torn apart by the creatures.

Many survivors are killed as they retreat into the station, where the creatures run amok, killing as many people as they can.  The remaining survivors barricade themselves in a stairway, blocking the rest of the creatures from getting inside.  Roarke and Frank Hill argue over whom is at fault and Hill tells Roarke he should be lying dead with the others outside.  Roarke said at least they had the guts to go with him.  Hill says, "Damn you!" to Roarke and stomps off.   Samantha breaks up the argument, saying they need to figure out what to do before they all die.   Samantha asks Roarke what his wife was like and if the Alpha had killed her.  Roarke tells Samantha that the Alpha 'turned' her and how he couldn't leave her like that.  he also says that these people will need a leader once this battle is over and she is that person.  She has hope and that is what they will need once this is done.  Despite their firepower, the survivors are whittled down one by one.  Hill manages to lure several of the creatures into one section of the station, playing the sounds of people crying on his smart phone as a ruse, killing many before he is overwhelmed.  Roarke runs out of ammo for his rifle and uses his pistol and combat knife to kill more creatures, and runs into the Alpha.  Despite his skill, he is over-matched by the Alpha's size and strength and retreats, looking for cover.  Roarke ascends a stairway with a door at the top and has an idea:  he stands in front of the doorway and allows the Alpha to charge him.  As they collide, Roarke opens the door and they both tumble out into the sunlight, which quickly kills the Alpha.

The survivors of the battle load the bus to go to the plane.   Samantha asks Roarke if he's going to go with them, and he replies that there's more creatures out there.  She says that since he killed the Alpha, wasn't that what he wanted?  Roarke tells her to hold onto that hope that she has.  The movie ends with the bus driving off in one direction and Roarke and his Road Runner in another.

Cast

Production 
The initial conception came from Chad Law, who had submitted a script to Project Greenlight.  Shooting mostly took place in Dallas, including the Dallas Municipal Building, and throughout U.S. Route 66 in Texas.  Influences include The Road Warrior, Assault on Precinct 13, 28 Days Later, and the novel I Am Legend.

Release 
Daylight's End premiered at the 2016 Dallas International Film Festival in April.  Vertical Entertainment released it theatrically in the United States on August 26, 2016. It grossed $11,257 in the UAE.  On home video, it grossed $106,032.

Reception 
Mike Wilson of Bloody Disgusting wrote that Daylight's End is neither cerebral nor original, but it is "still an enjoyable romp".  Hugo Ozman of Screen Anarchy called it "a solid thriller" and said that Kaufman should be given the opportunity to direct a big budget film.  Mark L. Miller of Ain't It Cool News said that the film is essentially a copy of various 1980s action films, but it has enough well-shot action scenes to make up for this.

References

External links 
 

2016 films
2016 horror films
2010s action horror films
American action horror films
American post-apocalyptic films
Films about viral outbreaks
2010s English-language films
Films directed by William Kaufman
2010s American films